Lecythis schomburgkii is a species of woody plant in the family Lecythidaceae. It is found in Brazil and Guyana. It is threatened by habitat loss.

References

schomburgkii
Flora of Brazil
Flora of Guyana
Vulnerable plants
Taxonomy articles created by Polbot